is 2015 Japanese romance film directed by Yukihiko Tsutsumi. It was released in Japan on May 23, 2015. 

The film is based on the novel of the same name by Kurumi Inui, both of which feature a significant twist at the very end.

Cast

Atsuko Maeda as Mayuko "Mayu" Naruoka
Kanro Morita as Suzuki from Side A 
Shota Matsuda as Suzuki (also known as Takkun)
Fumino Kimura as Miyako Ishimaru
 Takahiro Miura as Kaido
 Tomoya Maeno
 Noritake Kinashi as Shizuoka Branch Manager
 Satomi Tezuka as Shiho Ishimaru
 Tsurutaro Kitaoka as Kouki Ishimaru

Reception
The film had grossed  at the Japanese box office until June 14, 2015.

On Film Business Asia, Derek Elley gave the film an 8 out of 10 and called it a "well-cast, slickly entertaining '80s rom-com [that] has more than just its Big Twist."

References

External links
 

2015 romance films
Films directed by Yukihiko Tsutsumi
Japanese romance films
Nippon TV films
Films set in the 1980s
Films set in Shizuoka Prefecture
Toho films
2010s Japanese films